Shuja ud-Din (born 12 September 1913, date of death unknown) was an Afghan field hockey player who competed at the 1936 Summer Olympic Games, playing in both of his team's games.

References

External links
 

1913 births
Year of death missing
Afghan male field hockey players
Field hockey players at the 1936 Summer Olympics
Olympic field hockey players of Afghanistan

}